Cirque Plume is an internationally renowned contemporary circus company founded in 1984 by Bernard Kudlak in the Franche-Comté region of France.

French newspaper Le Parisien has described Cirque Plume as "the oldest of the New Circuses... It is one of the rare troupes who seem to be able to reconcile both the children, numerous in the audience... and adults, uncomfortable with the traditional circus, but who are rather in search of a certain atmosphere."  According to Le Figaro, "The word circus here is what you see and what you get. The techniques of juggling, acrobatics or flying trapeze are totally respected. Their chief originality is the way in which they are all brought into the gigantic mixer."

History
 1984 : Cirque Plume is founded
 1986 : Avignon "Off" Theatre Festival
 1988 : Spectacle de Cirque et de Merveilles
 1990 : Grand Prix national du cirque
 1991 : No Animo Mas Anima
 1993 : Toiles
 1996 : L'harmonie est elle municipale?
 1999 : Mélanges (opéra plume)
 2001 : First performance in New York City, USA
 2002 : Récréation
 2004 : Plic Ploc
 2009 : L'Atelier du Peintre
 2013 : Tempus fugit ? Une ballade sur le chemin perdu

See also 
Nouveau cirque

References

External links
 Cirque Plume - Official site

Circuses
Franche-Comté